Wapato School District 207 is a public school district based in Wapato, Yakima County, Washington, United States.  In the 2010-2011 school year the district had an enrollment of approximately 3,300 students.  The student body is culturally diverse: 71.9% of the students are Hispanic and 19.7% are American Indian.  29% of the students are identified as migrant and 100% of the students qualified for free or reduced meals.  Nearly one in five students are from the Yakama Nation, which is centered in nearby Toppenish.

In February 2011 67% of voters approved a $20 million bond to renovate and expand Wapato High School.  The state agreed to provide an additional $23 million.  The project will renovate or largely replace the existing high school, first constructed in the late 1950s.

Schools
The district operates Seven schools:
 
Adams Elementary School 
Camas Elementary School
Satus Elementary School
Wapato Middle School
Wapato High School
Pace Alternative High School
Simcoe Elementary

References

External links
 
 OSPI State Report Card 2012-2013
 Yakama Nation official site

School districts in Washington (state)
Education in Yakima County, Washington